Retaliation is the second and final album by American crossover thrash band Carnivore. It was released in 1987 by Roadrunner Records and later released on CD in 1991 without tracks 4 and 9. It was re-issued with a different cover on January 23, 2001, containing three demo tracks from the previous album. 

The same album cover was also used (with a different editing) by the italian hardcore band Wretched (punk band) for their EP "In Nome del Loro Potere Tutto è Stato Fatto" released in March 1983.

Critical reception

In 2005, Retaliation was ranked number 316 in Rock Hard magazine's book of The 500 Greatest Rock & Metal Albums of All Time.

Track listing
All songs written by Peter Steele, except when noted.
"Jack Daniel's and Pizza" (0:55)
"Angry Neurotic Catholics" (2:48)
"S.M.D." (2:27)
"Ground Zero Brooklyn" (4:40)
"Race War" (5:56)
"Inner Conflict" (5:03)
"Jesus Hitler" (5:17)
"Technophobia" (3:56)
"Manic Depression" (Jimi Hendrix) (3:07)
"USA for USA" (3:21)
"Five Billion Dead" (3:02)
"Sex and Violence" (3:51)
"World Wars III and IV" (demo) (7:42) – reissue only
"Carnivore" (demo) (3:41) – reissue only
"The Subhuman" (demo) (11:09) – reissue only

Credits 
Peter Steele – vocals, bass guitar
Marc Piovanetti – guitar, vocals
Louie Beato – drums

Production
Produced and mixed By Alex Perialas
Engineered by Michael Marciano and Alex Perialas

References

1987 albums
Carnivore (band) albums
Albums produced by Alex Perialas
Roadrunner Records albums